Alexander John (born 3 May 1986 in Zeulenroda, East Germany) is a German track and field athlete who specialises in the 110 metres hurdles.

International competitions

1Disqualified in the semifinals

External links 
 
 
 
 

1986 births
Living people
People from Zeulenroda-Triebes
People from Bezirk Gera
German male hurdlers
Sportspeople from Thuringia
Olympic athletes of Germany
Athletes (track and field) at the 2012 Summer Olympics
Athletes (track and field) at the 2016 Summer Olympics
World Athletics Championships athletes for Germany
German national athletics champions